LNM or lnm may refer to:

LNM Holdings, a former steel company, now part of ArcelorMittal
Lebanese National Movement, political front active in the early days of the Lebanese Civil War
LNM Institute of Information Technology, Jaipur, India
lnm, Langam language (ISO 639-3 abbreviation), language of New Guinea
Lecture Notes in Mathematics, a book series in the field of mathematics
Louisiana Naval Militia, a defunct military reserve of the United States Navy